Bone morphogenetic protein type I receptors are  single pass, type I transmembrane proteins. They belong to a class of receptor serine/threonine kinases that bind members of the TGF beta superfamily of ligands—the bone morphogenetic proteins.

The three types of type I BMP receptors are ACVR1, BMPR1A and BMPR1B.

External links
 

Receptors
Transmembrane receptors
S/T domain
GS domain
Bone morphogenetic protein
EC 2.7.11